False Pass Airport  is a state owned, public use airport in False Pass, a city in the Aleutians East Borough of the U.S. state of Alaska. Scheduled airline service to Cold Bay Airport and Akutan Airport is provided by Grant Aviation

As per Federal Aviation Administration records, the airport had 505 passenger boardings (enplanements) in calendar year 2008, 482 enplanements in 2009, and 321 in 2010. It is included in the National Plan of Integrated Airport Systems for 2011–2015, which categorized it as a general aviation airport (the commercial service category requires at least 2,500 enplanements per year).

Facilities and aircraft 
False Pass Airport covers 20 acres (8 ha) at an elevation of 20 feet (6 m) above mean sea level. It has one runway designated 13/31 with a gravel surface measuring 2,100 by 75 feet (640 x 23 m). For the 12-month period ending December 31, 2005, the airport had 1,050 aircraft operations, an average of 87 per month: 52% general aviation and 48% air taxi.

Airlines and destinations 
The following airlines offer scheduled passenger service at this airport:

Statistics

References

External links 
 Airport diagram for False Pass (KFP) (GIF). FAA, Alaska Region. 25 Dec 2003.
 Topographic map from USGS The National Map
 Resources for this airport:
 
 
 

Airports in Aleutians East Borough, Alaska